Elophila acornutus is a moth in the family Crambidae. It was described by David John Lawrence Agassiz in 2012. It is found in the Democratic Republic of the Congo, Sudan and Uganda.

The wingspan is 12–14 mm for males and 15–17 mm for females. The forewings are fuscous with a whitish subbasal cross line. The termen is dull orange. The basal area of the hindwings is dark fuscous. Adults have been recorded on wing from January to February and from April to May.

Etymology
The species name refers to the absence of cornuti in the aedeagus.

References

Acentropinae
Moths described in 2012
Moths of Africa